Omar Colmenares (born 13 December 1945) is a Venezuelan former footballer. He played in four matches for the Venezuela national football team from 1967 to 1975. He was also part of Venezuela's squad for the 1967 South American Championship.

References

1945 births
Living people
Venezuelan footballers
Venezuela international footballers
Place of birth missing (living people)
Association football goalkeepers
Carabobo F.C. players
Aragua F.C. managers